KMPG (1520 AM) is a radio station broadcasting a Regional Mexican format. Licensed to Hollister, California, United States, it serves the Gilroy/Hollister area.  The station is currently owned by Promo Radio Corp.

KMPG is the only AM station in California that requires critical hours operation. It must sign off the air at sunset to prevent interference to Class A clear-channel station KOKC in Oklahoma City, Oklahoma, which is also on 1520 kHz.

References

External links

"Local Radio Station Brings Heartland Home," Hollister Free Lance, October 7, 2004

MPG
MPG
MPG